Storm Before Calm is the fourth album of the Irish black metal band Primordial. It was originally released in 2002.

Track listing

The UK edition of the album has an 8th track titled "The Burning Season"  - 8:45

Credits
Alan Averill - Vocals 
Ciáran MacUiliam - Guitar 
Feargal Flannery - Guitar
Pól "Paul" MacAmlaigh - Bass
Simon O'Laoghaire - Drums

References

2002 albums
Primordial (band) albums
Hammerheart Records albums